This article lists political parties in Paraguay.
Paraguay was a one party dominant state with the Colorado Party until the Paraguayan General Election in 2008 when the opposition, Patriotic Alliance for Change, won the presidency.

Parties

Parliamentary parties

Coalitions

Country Forward (Avanza Pais, AP)

Other parties
Christian Democratic Party (Partido Demócrata Cristiano)
Paraguayan Communist Party (Partido Comunista Paraguayo)
Party for a Country of Solidarity (Partido País Solidario)
Revolutionary Socialist Party (Partido Socialista Revolucionario)
Workers' Party (Partido de los Trabajadores)
Revolutionary Febrerista Party (Partido Revolucionario Febrerista)

Former parties
The Paraguayan Liberal Party fought with the Colorado Party for dominance of the country during the first half of the 20th century. By the end of the Alfredo Stroessner regime the Liberal Party of Paraguay no longer existed, but its political successor, the Authentic Radical Liberal Party, is now the second largest political party in the country.

See also
 Politics of Paraguay
 List of political parties by country
 Liberalism and radicalism in Paraguay

 
Paraguay
Political parties
Political parties
Paraguay